William Clifford is a retired American professional soccer defender who spent three seasons in the USISL.

Playing career 
In 1992, Clifford graduated from Sacred Heart High School.  He attended the University of South Carolina, playing on the men's soccer team from 1992 to 1995.  In 1996, he turned professional with the South Carolina Shamrocks of the USISL.  On February 2, 1997, the Columbus Crew selected Clifford in the third round (twenty-eighth overall) of the 1997 MLS Supplemental Draft.  The Crew released him and he moved to the Jacksonville Cyclones for two seasons.  In April 1998, Clifford suffered a career ending broken foot during practice.

References 

Living people
American soccer players
Jacksonville Cyclones players
Association football defenders
South Carolina Gamecocks men's soccer players
South Carolina Shamrocks players
USISL Select League players
A-League (1995–2004) players
Columbus Crew draft picks
Year of birth missing (living people)
Soccer players from Massachusetts
Sportspeople from Plymouth County, Massachusetts